Catherine Clinch (born 2009) is an Irish child actress. She made her film debut in The Quiet Girl (2022).

Life and career

Clinch grew up in the village of Ranelagh near Dublin. Her father, Tom Clinch, is a stockbroker, and her mother is the singer Méav Ní Mhaolchatha. She took acting classes from a young age.

Clinch first appeared on screen in Colm Bairéad's The Quiet Girl (An Cailín Ciúin) as Cáit, a reserved 9-year-old who spends the summer of 1981 on a distant relative's farm. Auditions sought a lead actress who could speak Irish, the language of most of the film, and advertised the role at Irish-language schools during the COVID-19 pandemic. The film's producers recalled deciding quickly that Clinch was right for the role—able to carry the film—when they saw her audition tape. Shot in 2020 and released in 2022, the film was critically acclaimed alongside praise in particular for Clinch's performance. She was commended for conveying "a deep reservoir of emotions" while showing studious restraint. She was awarded Best Actress in a Leading Role for The Quiet Girl at the 18th IFTAs (the Irish equivalent of the BAFTAs).

References

External links

Living people
2009 births
Irish film actresses
21st-century Irish actresses
Film child actresses
Irish child actresses
People from Ranelagh